Dan Tiernan (born ) is a British stand-up comedian from Manchester. In 2022, he was named "British Comedian of the Year", and the BBC New Comedy Award.

Background

Career
Tiernan took a comedy course at age 21.

He won The Frog and Bucket comedy club's "Beat the Frog" new stand-up competition in 2020. In 2021, he was a finalist in the Leicester Mercury Comedian of the Year at the Leicester Comedy Festival.

Personal life
Tiernan is neurodiverse and dyspraxic. He is gay. He has a younger sister.

References

English stand-up comedians
Comedians from Manchester
21st-century English comedians
1990s births
LGBT TikTokers
Living people
Date of birth missing (living people)